The Eclipse Stakes is a Melbourne Racing Club Group 3 Thoroughbred horse race held under quality handicap conditions, for horses aged three years old and upwards, over a distance of 1800 metres, run at Sandown Racecourse, Melbourne, Australia in mid November. Total prize money is A$200,000.

History
The race was not held for 2 years during World War II. The Melbourne Racing Club moved the race predominantly to Sandown in 1994. However at times the race has been rescheduled and held at Caulfield as was the case in 2013 when Sandown Racecourse was under construction.
When held at Sandown Racecourse, the race has been scheduled on the inner Lakeside racecourse at times.

In 2021-22 the race was run at Caulfield Racecourse.

Grade
 1937–1978 - Principal race
 1979–1995 - Listed race
 1996 onwards  - Group 3

Venue

 1937–1993 - Caulfield Racecourse
 1994–1996 - Sandown Racecourse
 1997 - Caulfield Racecourse 
 1998–2001 - Sandown Racecourse
 2002–2003 - Caulfield Racecourse
 2004–2012 - Sandown Racecourse 
 2013 - Caulfield Racecourse
 2014–2020 - Sandown Racecourse
 2021–present - Caulfield Racecourse

Distance

 1937–1939 - 1 miles (~2200 metres)
 1940 - 1 miles (~2000 metres)
 1941 - 1 miles (~2400 metres)
 1944 - 1 miles (~2200 metres)
 1945–1952 - 1 miles (~2400 metres)
 1953–1972 - 1 miles (~2000 metres)
 1973–1993 - 2000 metres
 1994–1996 - 2128 metres
 1997 - 2000 metres
 1998 - 2128 metres
 1999–2001 - 2119 metres
 2002–2003 - 2020 metres
 2004 - 1800 metres
 2005 - 2100 metres
 2006–2007 - 1800 metres
 2008 - 2100 metres
 2009 onwards - 1800 metres

Winners

 2022 - Milford
 2021 - Regalo Di Gaetano
 2020 - So Si Bon
 2019 - Pacodali
 2018 - Tally
 2017 - Payroll
 2016 - Turnitaround
 2015 - Casino Dancer
 2014 - Zabisco
 2013 - Mouro
 2012 - Eclair Surprise
 2011 - Rothera
 2010 - Viking Hero
 2009 - Bashful Girl
 2008 - Eskimo Dan
 2007 - Like It Is
 2006 - Utility
 2005 - Aqua D'Amore
 2004 - Requisite
 2003 - Zazzman
 2002 - Damaschino
 2001 - Fields Of Omagh
 2000 - Tickle My
 1999 - Taberann
 1998 - Prime Address
 1997 - Burning Embers
 1996 - Gold City
 1995 - Broann
 1994 - Innocent King
 1993 - Palareign
 1992 - Fraar
 1991 - Luisant Bijou
 1990 - Gamine
 1989 - Eastern Classic
 1988 - Super Impose
 1987 - Prince Gano
 1986 - So Vague
 1985 - So Vague
 1984 - Brave Salute
 1983 - Allez Bijou
 1982 - Range Rover
 1981 - Pride Of Century
 1980 - Raspadora
 1979 - Bit Of A Skite
 1978 - Minuetto
 1977 - Princess Veronica
 1976 - Better Draw
 1975 - Shiftmar
 1974 - Leica Lover
 1973 - Perfect Time
 1972 - Adrian
 1971 - Sky Call
 1970 - What's Brewing
 1969 - Our Faith
 1968 - Wings Of The Morning
 1967 - Sunhaven
 1966 - Gala Crest
 1965 - Beau Guard
 1964 - Tobacco Leaf
 1963 - Bengal Tiger
 1962 - Delville
 1961 - Teppo Star
 1960 - Savage
 1959 - Dawdie
 1958 - Famed
 1957 - Roman Holiday
 1956 - Baystone
 1955 - Kosciusko
 1954 - Veiled Peak
 1953 - Rio Janeiro
 1952 - Morse Code
 1951 - Merry Scout
 1950 - Morse Code
 1949 - Bruin
 1948 - Kongmeng
 1947 - Fine Fettle
 1946 - Propontis
 1945 - Don Pedro
 1944 - Peter
 1943 - race not held
 1942 - race not held
 1941 - Lucrative
 1940 - True Flight
 1939 - Maikai
 1938 - Manolive
 1937 - Balkan Prince

See also
 List of Australian Group races
 Group races

References

Horse races in Australia
Open middle distance horse races